1973–74 Yugoslav First League (Prva savezna liga Jugoslavije, Prvenstvo 1973/74) competition was the 46th top league season since 1923 in various incarnations of Yugoslavia. It was won by Hajduk Split by the tightest of margins over second placed Velež. The two teams were tied on points at the end of the season, so the goal difference decided the title.

Had the current three-points-for-a-win system been in use instead of the standard two-points-for-a-win that was used at the time, Velež Mostar would have been champions with 64 points, while Hajduk would have been be second with 63.

This was Hajduk's 7th league title overall (their 5th after the World War II).

Teams
A total of eighteen teams contested the league, including sixteen sides from the 1972–73 season and two sides promoted from the 1972–73 Yugoslav Second League (YSL) as winners of the two second level divisions East and West. The league was contested in a double round robin format, with each club playing every other club twice, for a total of 34 rounds. Two points were awarded for wins and one point for draws.

Spartak Subotica and Sutjeska Nikšić were relegated from the 1972–73 Yugoslav First League after finishing the season in bottom two places of the league table.  The two clubs promoted to top level were Proleter Zrenjanin and NK Zagreb.

League table

Results

Top scorers

See also
 1973–74 Yugoslav Second League
 1973 Yugoslav Cup

External links
 Yugoslavia Domestic Football Full Tables
 1974 Kup Marsala Tita

Yugoslav First League seasons
Yugo
1973–74 in Yugoslav football